Josiah Alexander Van Orsdel (November 17, 1860 – August 7, 1937) was an Associate Justice of the United States Court of Appeals for the District of Columbia.

Education and career

Born on November 17, 1860, in New Bedford, Pennsylvania, Van Orsdel received an Artium Baccalaureus degree in 1885 from Westminster College in New Wilmington, Pennsylvania, then read law in 1890. He was county and prosecuting attorney for Laramie County, Wyoming starting in 1892. He was a member of the Wyoming House of Representatives starting in 1894. He was the Attorney General of Wyoming from 1898 to 1905. He was an associate justice of the Wyoming Supreme Court from 1905 to 1906. He was a United States Assistant Attorney General for the United States Department of Justice from 1906 to 1907.

Federal judicial service

Van Orsdel received a recess appointment from President Theodore Roosevelt on November 14, 1907, to an Associate Justice seat on the Court of Appeals of the District of Columbia (the United States Court of Appeals for the District of Columbia from June 7, 1934, now the United States Court of Appeals for the District of Columbia Circuit) vacated by Associate Justice Louis E. McComas. He was nominated to the same position by President Roosevelt on December 3, 1907. He was confirmed by the United States Senate on December 12, 1907, and received his commission the same day. His service terminated on August 7, 1937, due to his death.

References

Sources
 

1860 births
1937 deaths
Westminster College (Pennsylvania) alumni
Members of the Wyoming House of Representatives
Wyoming Attorneys General
Justices of the Wyoming Supreme Court
Judges of the United States Court of Appeals for the D.C. Circuit
United States court of appeals judges appointed by Theodore Roosevelt
20th-century American judges
United States federal judges admitted to the practice of law by reading law
People from Adams Morgan